Why Johnny Can't Read—And What You Can Do About It is a 1955 book-length exposé on American reading education by Rudolf Flesch. It was an immediate bestseller for 37 weeks and became an educational cause célèbre.

In this book, the author concluded that the whole-word (look-say) method was ineffective because it lacked phonics training. In addition, Flesch was critical of the simple stories and limited text and vocabulary in the Dick and Jane style readers that taught students to read through word memorization.  Flesch also believed that the look-say method did not properly prepare students to read more complex materials in the upper grade levels.

See also 
 Basal reader
 Primer (textbook)
 Dumbing Us Down
Reading education in the United States#History
Why Johnny Can't Add

References

Bibliography

Further reading 

 
 
 
 

1955 non-fiction books
Harper & Brothers books
Books about education
Works about reading
English-language books
Reading (process)
Learning to read